Emmanuel Adama Mahama was a Ghanaian politician. He served as a Member of Parliament during the First Republic of Ghana. He is the father of John Dramani Mahama, the 4th President of the 4th Republic of Ghana.

Political career 
An educator and rice farmer, he was the first Minister of State for the Northern Region under the Nkrumah government. Mahama also served as a senior presidential adviser during Ghana's Third Republic under Hilla Limann. He was also the first MP for the West Gonja constituency.

Personal life 
He was a Presbyterian. His son, John Dramani Mahama was the president of Ghana from July 2012 until January 2017. His younger son, Ibrahim Mahama, is a businessman.

See also
Nkrumah government

References

|-

|-

Ghanaian MPs 1951–1954
Ghanaian MPs 1954–1956
Ghanaian MPs 1956–1965
Government ministers of Ghana
Ghanaian Presbyterians
Ghanaian Protestants
Ghanaian educators
Ghanaian presidential advisors